The Finnish Transport Infrastructure Agency, shortened to FTIA, is a Finnish government agency responsible for the maintenance of Finland's road, rail, and waterway systems. The agency's annual budget is 2.1 billion euros. The parent organization is the Ministry of Transport and Communications.

History 
Until 1 January 2019 the name of the agency was Finnish Transport Agency.  Finnish Transport Agency was founded in January 2010. The agency took over the operations of three separate transportation agencies; the Finnish Rail Administration (RHK), the Finnish Maritime Administration, and the Finnish Road Administration.

In January 2019 due to changes in the organizations, the traffic control tasks for road traffic, rail traffic, and maritime routes were incorporated into Fintraffic. Also some other functions were moved to the new Finnish Transport and Communications Agency Traficom.

Operations

Road network 
The Finnish road network consists of highways, municipal street networks and private roads. In tandem with the fifteen regional ELY centers, the FTIA is responsible for the maintenance and development of the state-owned road network. There are 78,000 kilometres of highways maintained by the FTIA, of which about 50,000 are paved. In all, the Finnish road network is 454,000 kilometers long, of which about 350,000 are privately-owned. There are a total of 5,000 kilometers of pedestrian walkways and bicycle tracks in Finland.

Railway network 

The FTIA is responsible for the planning, construction, maintenance, and traffic control of the Finnish railway network. For most of the rail network's history, the primary user has been VR, but this has been projected to change with the Sipilä Cabinet's rail reform program. At the end of 2014, the total length of the Finnish railway network was 5,944 kilometers, of which 3,256 was electrified. The FTA spends about 200 million euros on rail infrastructure maintenance annually.

Waterways 
The FTIA maintains approximately 8,300 kilometers of coastal fairway and 8,000 kilometers of inland waterways as part of Finland's waterway network. FTA is also responsible for producing charts (ENC & RNC) covering Finland waterways and coastal waters.

References

External links
 Finnish Transport Infrastructure Agency
 FTA ENC Charts Viewer

Railway infrastructure managers
Rail transport in Finland
Road authorities
Transport organisations based in Finland